Port and starboard are nautical terms for watercraft and aircraft, referring respectively to the left and right sides of the vessel, when aboard and facing the bow (front).

Vessels with bilateral symmetry have left and right halves which are mirror images of each other. One asymmetric feature is where access to a boat, ship, or aircraft is at the side, it is usually only on the port side (hence the name).

Side
Port and starboard unambiguously refer to the left and right side of the vessel, not the observer. That is, the port side of the vessel always refers to the same portion of the vessel's structure, and does not depend on which way the observer is facing.

This convention allows orders and information to be given unambiguously, without needing to know which way any particular crew member is facing.

Etymology

The term starboard derives from the Old English steorbord, meaning the side on which the ship is steered. Before ships had rudders on their centrelines, they were steered with a steering oar at the stern of the ship on the right hand side of the ship, because more people are right-handed. The "steer-board" etymology is shared by the German Steuerbord, Dutch stuurboord and Swedish styrbord, which gave rise to the French tribord, Italian tribordo, Catalan estribord, Portuguese estibordo, Spanish estribor and Estonian tüürpoord.

Since the steering oar was on the right side of the boat, it would tie up at the wharf on the other side. Hence the left side was called port. The Oxford English Dictionary cites port in this usage since 1543.

Formerly, larboard was often used instead of port. This is from Middle English ladebord and the term lade is related to the modern load. Larboard sounds similar to starboard and in 1844 the Royal Navy ordered that port be used instead. The United States Navy followed suit in 1846. Larboard continued to be used well into the 1850s by whalers.  In chapter 12 of Life on the Mississippi (1883) Mark Twain writes larboard was used to refer to the left side of the ship (Mississippi River steamboat) in his days on the river – circa 1857–1861. Lewis Carroll rhymed larboard and starboard in "Fit the Second" of The Hunting of the Snark (1876).

An Anglo-Saxon record of a voyage by Ohthere of Hålogaland used the word "bæcbord" ("back-board") for the left side of a ship. With the steering rudder on the starboard side the man on the rudder had his back to the bagbord (Nordic for portside) side of the ship. The words for "port side" in other European languages, such as German Backbord, Dutch and Afrikaans bakboord, Swedish babord, Spanish babor, Portuguese  bombordo, Italian babordo, French bâbord and Estonian pakpoord, are derived from the same root.

Importance of standard terms
The navigational treaty convention, the International Regulations for Preventing Collisions at Sea—for instance, as appears in the UK's Merchant Shipping (Distress Signals and Prevention of Collisions) Regulations 1996 (and comparable US documents from the US Coast Guard)—sets forth requirements for maritime vessels to avoid collisions, whether by sail or powered, and whether a vessel is overtaking, approaching head-on, or crossing. To set forth these navigational rules, the terms starboard and port are essential, and to aid in in situ decision-making, the two sides of each vessel are marked, dusk to dawn, by navigation lights, the vessel's starboard side by green and its port side by red. Aircraft are lit in the same way.

See also
 Anatomical terms of location, another example of terms of directionality that do not depend on the location of the observer for things that are bilaterally symmetrical 
 Dexter and sinister
 Direction (disambiguation)
 Glossary of nautical terms
 Handedness
 Laterality
 Proper right and proper left
 Reflection symmetry
 Sinistral and dextral

Notes

References

Aeronautics
Nautical terminology
Orientation (geometry)